Battle of the Dardanelles may refer to:

During the Ottoman–Venetian War of 1645–1669:
 Battle of the Dardanelles (1654)
 Battle of the Dardanelles (1655)
 Battle of the Dardanelles (1656)
 Battle of the Dardanelles (1657)

During other conflicts:
 Battle of the Dardanelles (1807), during the Russo-Turkish War (1806-1812)
 Battle of Elli (1912), during the First Balkan War
 Naval operations in the Dardanelles Campaign (1915–16), during the First World War